is a humanoid persona voiced by a singing synthesizer application developed by 1st Place Co., Ltd., headquartered in Meguro, Tokyo, Japan. They use Yamaha Corporation's Vocaloid 3 singing synthesizer technology. Her voice is created using samples of Lia. She has performed at live concerts onstage as either an animated projection or a Pepper's ghost. Many songs have been made with her.

IA's name was taken from her voice provider's name, "Lia". She was illustrated by Aka Akasaka, the author of Kaguya-sama: Love Is War and Oshi no Ko.

Development
After Lia got married and was expecting a baby she was forced to put her career as a singer on hold. Because of this, production began on IA as a way to "stand in" as a substitute during the singer's absence.

IA was developed by 1st Place Co., Ltd. using Yamaha's Vocaloid 3. Her voice was created by taking voice samples from singer Lia at a controlled pitch and tone.  She was the first release for the "Aria on the Planetes" project, of which the CeVIO Creative Studio vocal also made by 1st Place, named "One", is also a part of.

The design philosophy 1st Place worked toward was to make the voice simple and straightforward but easy to adjust and customize, letting creators create their own version of IA.

In October 2013, IA's software was announced to have an update for the Mac during the promotional period for the IA × Super GT Circuit Beats album.

Additional software
In 2014 a prototype vocal called "IA -Aria On the Planetes- α Type C" was released as a free trial version via a one-month long feedback campaign.

On June 27, 2014, a new add-on for IA, called IA Rocks, was released. Once imported into the Vocaloid 4, it was possible to cross-synthesis the two vocals.

In Jan 2016, it was announced she would be released for CeVIO Creative Studio, receiving a talking vocal.

Marketing
Information on IA was released much slower than the average Vocaloid. Her promotions have taken the approach to make her seem otherworldly and mysterious.

The licensing for IA is slightly different than past Vocaloids. Unlike some past Vocaloids, users can use her image on CDs, flyers and posters without requesting permission, although some consent from the company is needed for greater use of her image. This is a departure from past Vocaloids such as Crypton Future Media, who requires you to ask permission for use of their Vocaloids' images on things such as CDs, flyers and posters.

Characteristics

Featured music
"Children Record" by Jin, is considered one of her most popular songs with over 3,000,000 views on Niconico.

"Six Trillion Years and Overnight Story" by Kemu, is also considered to be one of her most popular songs with over 8,000,000 views on Niconico and 24,000,000 views on YouTube.

References

External links
 Official Website 

Vocaloids introduced in 2012
Fictional singers
Japanese idols
Virtual influencers
Japanese popular culture